The Mongolian Social Democratic Party (sometimes also referred to as Sotsdek nam) is a political party in Mongolia.

It was founded in 1990 by Bat-Erdeniin Batbayar. Other prominent members included A.Ganbaatar, Losolyn Byambajargal and Radnaasümbereliin Gonchigdorj. A considerable number of members came from the mathematics and physics departments of Mongolia's National University. The party was part of the Mongolian Democratic Union that ruled from 1996 to 2000. It merged with the Democratic Party in 2000, thus all of the Social Democratic Party became members of the Democratic Party except A.Ganbaatar.

It reformed in 2004 and ran 19 candidates, but did not win any seats at the 2012 Mongolian parliamentary elections.

References

External links
Mongolian Social Democratic Party web site (in Mongolian)

1990 establishments in Mongolia
Political parties established in 1990
Political parties in Mongolia
Social democratic parties in Asia